The Men's 50 Backstroke event at the 11th FINA World Aquatics Championships swam on 30 – 31 July 2005 in Montreal, Canada. Preliminary and Semifinal heats swam on 30 July; the Final was 31 July.

Prior to the start of the event, the existing World (WR) and Championship (CR) records were both:
WR and CR: 24.80 swum by Thomas Rupprath (Australia) on 27 July 2003 in Barcelona, Spain

Results

Final

Semifinals

Preliminaries

References

Swimming at the 2005 World Aquatics Championships